Boonie Bears: The Big Top Secret is a 2016 Chinese animated adventure comedy film directed by Ding Liang and Lin Yongchang. The film is the third installment in the Boonie Bears film series based on the animated series of the same name, following the 2015 film Boonie Bears: Mystical Winter. It was released in China on 16 January 2016. It will be followed by Boonie Bears: Entangled Worlds, scheduled for release in 2017.

Plot

Cast
Zhang Wei
Zhang Bingjun
Tan Xiao

Reception
The film grossed  at the Chinese box office.

References

Chinese animated films
2016 animated films
2016 films
2016 computer-animated films
Animated adventure films
Animated comedy films
Le Vision Pictures films
Animated films based on animated series
2010s adventure comedy films
Circus films
Tianjin Maoyan Media films
2016 comedy films
Boonie Bears films